Vitalie Nagacevschi is a Moldovan politician.

Biography 

He has been a member of the Parliament of Moldova since 2009.

External links 
 Site-ul Parlamentului Republicii Moldova

References

1965 births
Living people
Liberal Democratic Party of Moldova MPs
Moldovan MPs 2009–2010